The Roman Catholic Diocese of Alagoinhas is a diocese located in the city of Alagoinhas in the Ecclesiastical province of São Salvador da Bahia in Brazil.

History
 28 October 1974: Established as Diocese of Alagoinhas from the Metropolitan Archdiocese of São Salvador da Bahia

Leadership
 Bishops of Alagoinhas (Latin Rite)
 José Floriberto Cornelis, O.S.B. (13 Nov 1974  – 24 May 1986), Archbishop (personal title)
 Jaime Mota de Farias (7 Nov 1986  – 24 Apr 2002)
 Paulo Romeu Dantas Bastos (24 Apr 2002 – 13 Jan 2021)

References
 GCatholic.org
 Catholic Hierarchy

Roman Catholic dioceses in Brazil
Christian organizations established in 1974
Alagoinhas, Roman Catholic Diocese of
Roman Catholic dioceses and prelatures established in the 20th century
1974 establishments in Brazil